Luis Cruz is a Mexican baseball shortstop.

Luis Cruz may also refer to:

Other sportsmen
Luis Cruz (Uruguayan footballer) (1925–1998), Uruguayan football midfielder
Luis Cruz (boxer) (born 1985), Puerto Rican boxer
Luis Cruz (Mexican footballer) (born 1997), Mexican football forward
Luis Cruz (athlete) in 1984 Central American and Caribbean Junior Championships in Athletics
Luis Cruz (ice hockey), Mexican ice hockey player
Luis Cruz (rower), participated in Rowing at the 2003 Pan American Games
Sergi Luís Cruz, manager of FC Palafrugell

Politicians
Luis Carrión Cruz (born 1952/1953), Nicaraguan politician
Luis Raúl Torres Cruz (born 1960), Puerto Rican politician
Luis Hernández Cruz (born 1958), Mexican politician
Luis F. Cruz, Puerto Rican accountant
Luis Cruz (governor) on List of Governors of Tucumán Province, Argentina

See also

José Luis Cruz Cruz (born 1959), Puerto Rican politician